Murray Town may refer to
 Murray Town, Sierra Leone, a district of Freetown
 Murray Town, South Australia, a town in the mid north of South Australia

See also
 Murrayville (disambiguation)